Club Balonmano Neptuno/Atlético Madrid was a Spanish professional handball team based in Madrid, Spain. Part of the Atlético Madrid sports organization. They played two seasons in the Liga ASOBAL and their home court was the Palacio Vistalegre.

History
Balonmano Atlético Madrid was created in the early 1950s, it won 11 Spanish Leagues and 10 Spanish Cups between 1952 and 1987, and reached the final of the 1984–85 European Cup and the 1986–87 EHF Cup; they lost both to, respectively, Metaloplastika Sabac and Granitas Kaunas. Jesús Gil disbanded the team in 1992, but it still competed as Atlético Madrid Alcobendas for two more seasons under the management of some stockholders before finally disappearing in 1994.

Los Colchoneros welcomed handball back into their organization in 2011, formally known as BM Ciudad Real, which folded and relocated to Madrid for financial reasons. The new team started off quite successfully, beating FC Barcelona Handbol 33–26 in the Supercup match in August 2011.

In July 2013, the club announced the shutdown of BM Neptuno/Atletico Madrid due to little financial support received from public and private entities.

Season by season

2 seasons in Liga ASOBAL

Trophies
Liga ASOBAL:
Runners-Up: (2). 2011–12, 2012–13.
Copa del Rey:
Champions: (2). 2012, 2013
Copa ASOBAL:
Runners-Up: (1). 2013
Supercopa ASOBAL:
Champions: (1). 2011
Runners-Up: (1). 2012
EHF Champions League
Runners-Up: (1). 2011–12.
IHF Super Globe:
Champions: (1). 2012

Home arenas

Notable players
  Isaías Guardiola (2011–2012)
 JJ Hombrados
 Julen Aguinagalde
 Jonas Källman
 David Davis
 Roberto García
 Xavier Barachet
 Joan Cañellas
 Mariusz Jurkiewicz
 Jakov Gojun
 Ivano Balić
 Kiril Lazarov
 Ólafur Stefánsson

Notable coaches
 Talant Duyshebaev

External links
BM Atletico Madrid Website 
RFEBM profile 
BM Atlético Madrid on Facebook

References

2011 establishments in the Community of Madrid
2013 disestablishments in the Community of Madrid
Defunct handball clubs
Spanish handball clubs
Handball clubs established in 2011
Sports clubs disestablished in 2013
Sports teams in Madrid